Rajeev Sagar Dam (alternatively Rajiv Sagar (Maksudangarh) Dam) is a dam near the  Katangi block in Balaghat district, Madhya Pradesh, India.

The dam was originally built in the 19th century.

It is approximately 60 km from Katangi, and a bus service is available for it.

References

Dams in Madhya Pradesh
Balaghat district
Dams completed in 2002
2002 establishments in Madhya Pradesh